Queen Eun'go was the last queen consort of Baekje and the only recorded wife of King Uija in history. She was also called as Grand Lady or Lady Eun'go.

Her name is mentioned only once in "Nihon Shoki". After the fall of Baekje by the Silla-Tang alliance, on 13 July 660 (20th years reign of King Uija), Queen Eun'go was captured by a Tang general Su Dingfang and sent to Tang, along with her husband, some of his sons, high-level ministers, also at least 88 generals and more than 12,000 civilians. According to the inscription on the Jeongnimsa Temple (대당평백제국비문, 大唐平百濟國碑文) and the Nihon Shoki book, the wife of one of the Baekje's generals played an important role in the fall of the Baekje, but there are claims that General Baekje's wife and Queen Eun'go are the same person in fact.

In popular culture
Portrayed by Song Ji-hyo, Park Eun-bin, and Jeon Min-seo in the 2011 MBC TV series Gyebaek.

References
 Samguk Sagi
 Aston, William George. (1896).  Nihongi: Chronicles of Japan from the Earliest Times to A.D. 697. London: Kegan Paul, Trench, Trubner.  OCLC 448337491
 은고(恩古) on Encykorea .

Royal consorts of Baekje
Year of birth unknown
Year of death unknown